John Costello may refer to:

John Costello (baseball) (born 1960), American baseball pitcher 
John Costello (English footballer) (1890–1915), English footballer 
John Costello (historian) (1943–1995), British military historian 
John A. Costello (1891–1976), Taoiseach of Ireland
John M. Costello (1903–1976), U.S. Representative from California
John Costello (Medal of Honor) (1850–?), U.S. Navy sailor and Medal of Honor recipient
John Costello (pastoralist) (1838–1923), Australian pastoralist
John W. Costello (born 1927), American attorney and politician in Massachusetts
John Costello (Gaelic footballer), Gaelic football player from County Laois
John P. Costello (1947–2010), U.S. Army general

See also
John Costelloe (politician) (c. 1900–?), Irish politician, member of Seanad Éireann from 1963 to 1965
John Costelloe (actor) (1961–2008), American actor